Oedipus Rex (Edipo re) is a 1967 Italian film directed by Pier Paolo Pasolini. Pasolini adapted the screenplay from the Greek tragedy Oedipus Rex written by Sophocles in 428 BC. The film was mainly shot in Morocco. It was presented in competition at the 28th Venice International Film Festival. It was Pasolini's first feature-length color film, but followed his use of color in "The Earth Seen from the Moon" episode in the portmanteau film The Witches (1967).

Plot
A son is born to a young couple in pre-war Italy. The child opens his eyes for the first time to see his loving mother and suckles on her breast. The father is motivated by jealousy, and believes the child will take away the love of his wife and send him back into the void. The soldier takes the baby into the desert to be abandoned, at which point the film's setting changes to the ancient world of Greece. The child is rescued and taken to the King of Corinth Polybus and Queen Merope of Corinth and raised as their own son because they are infertile. The child is given the name Oedipus.

Oedipus (Franco Citti) grows up believing that he is the biological son of Polybus and Merope. One day while cheating at a sports game an angry classmate calls him a foundling which enrages him. This torments and confuses him on the inside and plagues him with bad dreams and a feeling of ill omen. He asks his parents to visit the Oracle of Delphi in order to find out the opinions of the god Apollo. He travels to the Oracle alone. The Oracle tells him that his fate is to kill his father and make love to his mother. She laughs at him and tells him to begone and to not curse people with his presence. Oedipus runs away from the Oracle in anger. He decides he can't return to Corinth and wanders aimlessly in the desert. As he is walking down the sacred road of Apollo he is stopped by a wagon and some armed soldiers. The king named Laius who is riding on the wagon orders Oedipus to leave and treats him as a beggar. Oedipus hurls a huge stone breaking the legs of one of the soldiers. He runs off to the desert where he faces each soldier one by one and kills them before returning to the wagon where he kills king Laius and the wounded soldier. One of the king's escorts runs off to the desert to avoid being killed and survives.

Oedipus continues down the road where he comes across roving bands of displaced people fleeing the Sphinx. The Sphinx has terrorized the country of Thebes. It has caused so much death that Queen Jocasta has promised to marry anyone who can kill it. Oedipus solves the riddle of the Sphinx. He casts the sphinx down into the abyss while the sphinx warns him of the abyss that is within him. Oedipus is given his reward and is married to Queen Jocasta who is unbeknownst to him, his biological mother. After Oedipus is made king, a plague occurs and kills much of the city. Oedipus sends his brother-in-law Creon to the Oracle to receive news about how to stop it. Creon returns and tells him that for the plague to end, King Laius' killer must be brought to justice.

Oedipus sends for the blind prophet Tiresias to find out the name of the killer. Tiresias is reluctant to speak because he knows it will cause injury to both himself and Oedipus. Oedipus prods him to continue and Tiresias tells him that Oedipus is the killer. Oedipus banishes him from the city believing that his brother-in-law Creon put him up to it in order to steal the throne. Jocasta reveals to Oedipus that Laius was killed at the crossroads of Apollo's sacred road. She also tells him that the Oracle has been wrong before. The Oracle predicted Jocasta's son would kill his father so she sent for him to be killed in the desert.

Oedipus realizes with horror that the Oracle's prophecy has been fulfilled and that Jocasta and Laius were his birth parents. The old servant who brought Oedipus to the desert is called for and admits to him the truth. Jocasta commits suicide by hanging and Oedipus blinds himself. The scene then changes again to modern Italy where Oedipus and Angelo roam from town to town playing the flute. Oedipus returns to the meadow where he first opened his eyes as a child and finds peace.

Cast
Franco Citti as Oedipus
Silvana Mangano as Queen Jocasta
Alida Valli as Queen Merope
Julian Beck as Tiresias
Carmelo Bene as Creon
Ninetto Davoli as Ángelo
Luciano Bartoli as  King Laius 
Ahmed Belhachmi as Polybus
Francesco Leonetti as servant of Laius
Giandomenico Davoli as shepherd
Ivan Scratuglia as priest
Pier Paolo Pasolini as high priest
Paolo Ferrari as Oedipus' voice (voice actor)

Production
Pasolini began scouting locations in Romania for his film. He wanted a rugged, stark landscape that would resemble Greece. However he found them in the midst of an Agrarian revolution and was dismayed that he would have to choose a different location. He settled on Morocco, a land filled with mountains and desert which bears little resemblance to Greece. However it would suit the needs of his film.

Style
The film's style is intentionally ahistorical and uses various cultural motifs to create an other worldly environment. The actors are Italian and Berber, the film is shot in Morocco, and the music is largely taken from Romanian folk music but also from far flung oriental nations such as Indonesia and Japan. The costumes are also heavily stylized with medieval knight helmets and broad-brimmed straw hats and top hats fitted with wings. Many of the costumes use African, Aztec and Sumerian influences. This all serves to create a world foreign and yet completely of its own.

Pasolini begins and ends the film in 1920s Italy in what he calls an act of Freudian Sublimation. Oedipus plays the traditional Japanese Gagaku theme on his pipe and follows it with a Russian folk song about resistance.

Themes
Since Accattone, Pasolini had planned and hinted at making a film about the Oedipus Complex and its certain "autobiographical anxiety". Pasolini said of the film "in Oedipus, I tell the story of my complex of Oedipus. The child in the prologue is me, his father is my father, an infantry officer, and his mother, a teacher, is my mother. I tell my mythical life, naturally made epic by the legend of Oedipus." Pasolini's father Carlo Alberto Pasolini was a lieutenant in the Italian army and had a prominent Fascist leaning. The film can be seen as a sharp rebuke of Pasolini's own father and the militaristic, bourgeois Italy he had born into.

Another theme is the guilt of innocence, a reversal of original sin. Oedipus is aware of a problem in his life but he does not know what it is. Oedipus becomes the symbol of western man. He is blinded by the will of not knowing who he is and ignores the truth of his condition which leads him to catastrophe. To act as the counterpoint to modern man, the setting of ancient Greece is reconstructed in Morocco. It is an ahistorical, otherworldly setting outside of the confines of the modern bourgeois world.

Score
The score is composed heavily of Romanian folk music taken from the Electrecord release titled Anthology of Romanian folk music. Pasolini chose this music  for its ambiguous sound and language. Originally he had wanted to shoot the film in Romania as he felt it would be a good stand in for Ancient Greece but he had to leave due to political reasons. Writing on the matter he said "I gave up the idea of doing it there, but in recompense I found some folk-tunes which I liked a lot because they are extremely ambiguous: they are half-way between Slav, Greek and Arab songs, they are indefinable: it is unlikely that anyone who didn't have specialized knowledge could locate them; they are a bit outside history […] I wanted music which was a-historical, a-temporal". Other music used is the Japanese Gagaku theme and the Indonesian Kecak.

Antonio Fuselli's Marcetta Bandistica also opens and closes the film. It is the theme of the father. Mozart's String Quartet No.19 in C major K 465 serves as the theme of the mother. It is played to introduce the mother in the 1920s scene and is played several times on the flute by the blind prophet Tiresias. It brings to mind Oedipus' struggle with Jocasta and the hidden knowledge of his own birth.

Otto Stransky's tango  In Santa Lucia is played in the opening scene set in the 1920s era. At the end of the film, Oedipus plays both the Gagaku and the resistance song Funeral March of 1905 on his flute.

Shooting locations
The film was shot in Ouarzazate, Ait-Ben-Haddou and Zagora, Morocco. The film uses many local extras from those cities. The prologue scenes were shot in Casaletto Lodigiano and Sant'Angelo Lodigiano, Italy. The epilogue was shot in Piazza Maggiore in Bologna, Italy. Miscellaneous interiors were shot at the Dino De Laurentiis Cinematografica studios in Rome.

Relation to Sophocles play
The entire second part of the film is faithfully adapted from Sophocles' play Oedipus Rex. Much of the dialogue is taken straight from Sophocles. The first half depicts the events leading up to the play and is Pasolini's depiction of them with his own poetic style. The beginning and end of the film in 1920s Italy is an invention of Pasolini.

Awards
Venice Film Festival
Nominated for Golden Lion
1967

Italian National Syndicate of Film Journalist
Won 
Silver Ribbon
Alfredo Bini for Best Producer
Luigi Scaccianoce for Best Production Design
1968

Kinema Junpo Awards
Won Best Foreign Language Film
1970

See also
Oedipus Rex
Self-fulfilling prophecy

References

External links

Oedipus Rex at Southbanklondon.com

Films directed by Pier Paolo Pasolini
Italian drama films
1960s Italian-language films
Italian films based on plays
Moroccan drama films
Patricide in fiction
Incest in film
Films based on ancient Greek plays
Films based on works by Sophocles
Films based on classical mythology
Films shot in Morocco
Works based on Oedipus Rex
Films shot in Rome
Films shot in Italy
Films about curses
Films set in ancient Greece
Films set in Greece
Films set in the 5th century BC
1960s Italian films